The Grenada national cricket team represents the country of Grenada in cricket. The team is not a member of the International Cricket Council, but the Grenada Cricket Association is a member of the Windward Islands Cricket Board of Control, which itself is a member association of the West Indies Cricket Board, and players from Grenada generally represent the Windward Islands cricket team at domestic level and the West Indies at international level. Grenada has however played as a separate entity in matches which held Twenty20 status, but has not appeared in first-class or List A cricket. The team's coach, as of November 2013, is Ricky Williams. The team currently has two captains: Devon Smith, who captains the two-day team, and Andre Fletcher who captains the 20-over team.

History
A Grenada cricket team first appeared in West Indian cricket in 1887 against a touring Gentlemen of America team at the old Queen's Park. Ten years later the team was recorded playing against Lord Hawke's touring team, though unlike several matches during the tour, this match did not have first-class status.  In 1899, G. A. de Freitas and William Mignon became the first Grenada cricketers to play first-class cricket. In 1910, Grenada played in the inaugural Cork Windward Islands Challenge Cup, with the team participating in that tournament until 1939. There is a long gap between 1939 and Grenada's next recorded appearance, which came in the 1965 Windward Islands Tournament against St Vincent. By this time the Windward Islands were playing matches which held first-class status, with Queen's Park playing host to the team's inaugural first-class fixture in 1959 against the Marylebone Cricket Club. Grenada continued to play in the Windward Islands Tournament, and from 1975 its successor, the Heineken Trophy. Their participation in the tournament (under various names) continued into the 1990s, with home matches throughout this period being held at the old Queen's Park.

In 2000, just months after a major redevelopment, the old Queen's Park was severely damaged by Hurricane Ivan, necessitating its reconstruction in 2004. Having played in regional tournaments throughout the early to mid 2000s, Grenada were invited to take part in the 2006 Stanford 20/20, whose matches held official Twenty20 status. They played three matches in the tournament, defeating Dominica and Saint Vincent and the Grenadines in the first-round and quarter-final respectively, before losing to Guyana in the semi-finals. Two years later, they were invited to take part in the 2008 Stanford 20/20, playing two matches in the tournament, defeating Anguilla in the first-round, before losing to Barbados in the following round. These matches mark Grenada's only major appearances in cricket.

In August 2014, Grenada played against Bangladesh in a 50 over game during Bangladesh's tour of the West Indies.  Bangladesh ran out winners by 95 runs.

Notable players

International Players

Five players from Grenada have represented the West Indies Internationally.

 Apps denotes the number of appearances the player has made.
 Runs denotes the number of runs scored by the player.
 Wkts denotes the number of wickets taken by the player.

Many other Grenadian players have represented the Windward Islands cricket team domestically in the West Indies Regional Super50, Regional Four Day Competition and the Caribbean Twenty20.

Grenada players on the current Windward Islands cricket team
Devon Smith
Andre Fletcher
Nelon Pascal
Denis Smith

See also
List of Windward Islands first-class cricketers
List of Grenada Twenty20 players

Squad

Players with international caps are listed in bold.

source: 
Grenada v Bangladesh - August 2014
 Grenada Squad - 2014 Windward Championship
Grenada Squads - 2013 T20 & 2-day

Stanford 20/20

2006 Grenada Stanford 20/20 Squad
2008 Grenada Stanford 20/20 Squad

National cricket stadium

References

External links
Grenada at CricketArchive

Cricket in Grenada
National cricket teams
Cricket